John Crompton Weems (August 11, 1777January 20, 1862) was an American politician.

Born in 1777 in Calvert County, Maryland, Weems attended St. John's College of Annapolis, Maryland, and engaged in planting.  He was elected to the Nineteenth Congress to fill the vacancy caused by the resignation of Joseph Kent, was reelected to the Twentieth Congress, and served from February 1, 1826, to March 3, 1829.  He resumed agricultural pursuits afterwards, and died on his plantation, "Loch Eden", in Anne Arundel County, Maryland.  He is interred in a private cemetery on his estate.

External links 

 Weems Family papers at the University of Maryland Libraries

References

1777 births
1862 deaths
19th-century American politicians
Jacksonian members of the United States House of Representatives from Maryland